Parabagliettoa is a genus of crustose lichens in the family Verrucariaceae. It has 3 species. The genus was circumscribed in 2009 by Cécile Gueidan and Claude Roux, with Parabagliettoa dufourii assigned as the type species.

Species
Parabagliettoa cyanea 
Parabagliettoa disjuncta 
Parabagliettoa dufourii

References

Lichen genera
Verrucariales
Taxa described in 2009
Eurotiomycetes genera
Taxa named by Cécile Gueidan